The Goodlett Gin is a historic cotton gin in Historic Washington State Park in Hempstead County, Arkansas.  It was built in 1883 by David Goodlett, and was originally located near Ozan before it was moved to the state park in the late 1970s.  It is the only known operational steam gin in the United States.  It was fitted with a steam engine in 1898, and received major servicing in the 1930s and 1950s.

The gin was listed on the National Register of Historic Places in 1975.

See also
National Register of Historic Places listings in Hempstead County, Arkansas

References

Agricultural buildings and structures on the National Register of Historic Places in Arkansas
National Register of Historic Places in Hempstead County, Arkansas
Industrial buildings completed in 1883
Cotton gin
Individually listed contributing properties to historic districts on the National Register in Arkansas
1883 establishments in Arkansas
Cotton industry in the United States
Relocated buildings and structures in Arkansas
Industrial buildings and structures in Arkansas